Edwin J. Mather (June 4, 1887 – August 26, 1928) was an American football and basketball player and coach.  He was selected as an All-Western football player while playing for Lake Forest University in 1909 and went on to a coaching career at Kalamazoo College (1911–1916), Lake Forest (1916–1918), and the University of Michigan (1919–1928).

Early life and playing career
Mather was born in Ottumwa, Iowa and played three sports at Ottumwa High School.  He enrolled at Lake Forest University, where he played at the end position on the school's football team.  In 1909, he was captain of the Lake Forest football team and was selected as an all-Western end by the Chicago Daily News.  In selecting him for its All-Illinois football team that same year, the Chicago Record-Herald wrote:  "Mather, by virtue of his glittering achievements in 1908, had little trouble in clinching a place on the all-state combine. With another season in which to perfect the forward pass and the open style of play Mather developed into a terror on offense. As a defensive player he is rated among the headliners throughout Illinois. His forte is left end.  The game with DePauw Thanksgiving day marked the windup of Mather's college career."  He was also captain of the Lake Forest basketball team in his senior year.

Coaching career

Kalamazoo
In 1911, Mather was hired as the coach of all sports at Kalamazoo College, where he remained until 1916.  He was the head football coach for five seasons, from 1911 until 1915, compiling a record of 13–12. Mather's basketball teams at Kalamazoo won all of their home games four times and went undefeated in the 1914–15 season.  The teams also won the Michigan Intercollegiate Athletic Association titles in four of Mather's five years as the coach.  Mather's Kalamazoo College basketball teams had a combined record of 29–13.

Arkansas
With the entry of the United States into World War I, Mather entered the United States Army.  In March 1919, after being discharged from the Army, Mather took over as director and coach of athletics at the University of Arkansas.  In April 1919, Mather was reported to be organizing teams in basketball, tennis, volleyball, and track at the Fayetteville, Arkansas campus.

Michigan
In the fall of 1919, Mather was hired by the University of Michigan.  He was the head basketball coach at Michigan from 1919 to 1928 and coached the team to three Big Ten Conference titles and an overall record of 108–53 in his nine seasons as coach.  He led the team to an 18–4 overall record (8–4 in conference) during the 1920–21 season.  The 1921 team won its first eight and last eight games to tie the Wisconsin Badgers and Purdue Boilermakers for the Big Ten title. The team won back-to-back championships in 1925–26 and 1926–27.  The 1926 squad, which was captained by Richard Doyle who became the team's first All-American, tied with Purdue, the Iowa Hawkeyes and Indiana Hoosiers for the conference championship. The 1927 team had a new All-American, Bennie Oosterbaan, and won the school's first back-to-back championships and first outright championship with a 14–3 overall (10–2, Big Ten) record.

Mather was also an assistant football coach at Michigan for nine seasons, from 1919 to 1927.

Sickness and death
A few weeks after the Wolverines won the Big Ten championship for the 1926–27 season, Mather underwent surgery for cancer. Mather never fully recovered from the operation.  In the fall of 1927, he was put in charge of Michigan's freshman football team, and he returned as basketball coach at the beginning of the 1927–28 season.  However, Mather was forced to step down from his coaching duties on advice from his doctor.  While he visited the team for practices, the 1927–28 basketball team was coached by Michigan's athletic director, Fielding H. Yost.  A telephone line was installed at Mather's bedside, and football coach Harry Kipke relayed the plays to him and gave him a summary at the end of each game.

Mather died of cancer after a long illness in August 1928.  He was age 41 at the time of his death and was survived by his wife and two small sons.

Head coaching record

Football

Basketball

References

External links
 

1887 births
1928 deaths
American football ends
Arkansas Razorbacks football coaches
Basketball coaches from Iowa
Basketball players from Iowa
Kalamazoo Hornets football coaches
Kalamazoo Hornets men's basketball coaches
Lake Forest Foresters football coaches
Lake Forest Foresters football players
Lake Forest Foresters men's basketball players
Michigan Wolverines football coaches
Michigan Wolverines men's basketball coaches
College men's basketball head coaches in the United States
United States Army personnel of World War I
People from Ottumwa, Iowa
Players of American football from Iowa
Deaths from cancer in Michigan
American men's basketball players